The following lists events that happened in 2009 in North Korea.

Incumbents
Premier: Kim Yong-il
Supreme Leader: Kim Jong-il

References

Further reading

 
North Korea
Years of the 21st century in North Korea
2000s in North Korea
North Korea